Frederick William Beechey  (17 February 1796 – 29 November 1856) was an English naval officer, artist, explorer, hydrographer and writer.

Life and career
He was the son of two painters, Sir William Beechey, RA and his second wife, Anne Jessop. Born in London on 17 February 1796, he entered the Royal Navy at the age of 10 under the command of John Jervis, 1st Earl of St Vincent. He was promoted to midshipman on February 8 1807  and saw active service during the War of 1812. He served in the Battle of New Orleans. Because of this, he was promoted to 2nd lieutenant on March 10 1815

In early 1818, and now a lieutenant, Beechey sailed on HMS Trent under Lieutenant John Franklin in David Buchan's Arctic expedition, of which at a later period he published a narrative. In 1821, as an officer on HMS Adventure, he took part in the survey of the Mediterranean coast of Africa under the direction of Captain William Henry Smyth. His brother, Henry William Beechey, and he made an overland survey of this coast and published a full account of their work in 1828 under the title of Proceedings of the Expedition to Explore the Northern Coast of Africa from Tripoly Eastward in 1821-1822.

In 1825, Beechey was appointed to command . His task was to explore the Bering Strait in concert with Franklin and Parry operating from the east. In the summer of 1826, he passed the strait and a barge from his ship reached 71°23'31" N., and 156°21'30" W. near Point Barrow, which he named, a point only 146 miles west of that reached by Franklin's expedition from the Mackenzie River. The whole voyage lasted more than three years, and in the course of it, Beechey discovered several islands in the Pacific, and an excellent harbour near Cape Prince of Wales.

In 1826, he visited a Catholic mission in California. He wrote, "...with whips, canes and goads or sharp, pointed sticks to preserve silence and maintain order, and what seemed more difficult than either, to keep the congregation in their kneeling posture. The goads would reach a long way and inflict a sharp puncture without making any noise. The end of the church was occupied by a guard of soldiers under arms with fixed bayonets."

In July 1826, he named the three islands in the Bering Strait. Two were the Diomede Islands that Vitus Bering had named in 1728: "Ratmanoff Island" (Big Diomede) and "Krusenstern Island" (Little Diomede). Beechey called the uninhabited third islet "Fairway Rock", which is still its contemporary name. One of his crew, Petty Officer John Bechervaise, gave a detailed account of the voyage in his Thirty-six Years of a Seafaring Life by an Old Quartermaster, published privately in 1839. (The crewmember's namesake and great-great-grandson John Béchervaise (1910–1998) was a noted explorer of Antarctica.) In 1831, there appeared Beechey's Narrative of a Voyage to the Pacific and Bering's Strait to Co-operate with the Polar Expeditions, 1825-1828.

In 1835 and '36, Captain Beechey was employed on the coast survey of South America, and from 1837 to 1847, carried on similar work along the Irish coasts, and in the North Sea and English Channel. He carried out detailed tidal surveys during this period, which were published, with charts, in two Royal Society papers in 1848 and 1851. This was the first published work of its kind since Edmond Halley's tidal chart appeared in about 1702. He was appointed in 1850 to preside over the Marine Department of the Board of Trade.

In 1854, he was made rear admiral, and in the following year was elected president of the Royal Geographical Society.

Beechey Island, where Sir John Franklin wintered, was named by him after his father.

Family of painters
His daughter was painter Frances Anne Hopkins, who lived in Canada for 12 years and painted many scenes of canoe travel.

His parents and three of his brothers were painters:  admiral and painter Richard Brydges Beechey, portraitist Henry William Beechey, and portraitist George Duncan Beechey.

See also
 European and American voyages of scientific exploration

Publications

Notes

References
 
 
 
 
 Narrative of a voyage... 1825-28, by Captain F.W. Beechey, London, 1831, Page 337

External links 

 
 
 
 

19th-century explorers
1796 births
1856 deaths
British polar explorers
English explorers
English explorers of North America
English geographers
English hydrographers
Explorers of Canada
Explorers of the Arctic
Fellows of the Royal Society
Military personnel from London
Presidents of the Royal Geographical Society
Royal Navy officers